Die Wache is a German weekly police procedural show that was broadcast from 1994 until 2006 by RTL Television. Set in a fictional police station in Cologne, it was modelled on the British series The Bill and described typical police episodes and investigations.

The entire series consisted of 245 episodes of 45 minutes during 12 seasons, between 3 January 1994 and 8 June 2006.

Selected cast and characters

External links
 

1994 German television series debuts
2006 German television series endings
1990s German police procedural television series
2000s German police procedural television series
RTL (German TV channel) original programming
Television shows set in Cologne
German crime television series
German-language television shows
German television series based on British television series